The 2019–20 season is Wydad AC's 80th season in their existence and the club's 64th consecutive season in the top flight of Moroccan football. They have competed in the Botola, the Champions League, Arab Club Champions Cup, and the Throne Cup. The season started on 14 September 2019, and was scheduled to end on 1 July 2020. However, the season was suspended in March 2020, due to COVID-19 pandemic in Morocco, then resumed in July and ended in 11 October 2020.

Competitions

Overview

{| class="wikitable" style="text-align: center"
|-
!rowspan=2|Competition
!colspan=8|Record
!rowspan=2|Started round
!rowspan=2|Final position / round
!rowspan=2|First match
!rowspan=2|Last match
|-
!
!
!
!
!
!
!
!
|-
| Botola

| 
| style="background:silver;"| Runners–up
| 6 October 2019
| 11 October 2020
|-
| Throne Cup

| colspan=2| Round of 32
| colspan=2| 24 September 2019
|-
| Arab Club Champions Cup

| First round
| Second round
| 31 August 2019
| 23 November 2019
|-
| Champions League

| First round
| Semi-finals
| 15 September 2019
| 23 October 2020
|-
! Total

Ligue 1

League table

Results summary

Results by round

Matches
Unless otherwise noted, all times in WAT

Moroccan Throne Cup

Club Championship Cup

First round

Second round

Champions League

First round

Group stage

Group C

knockout stage

Quarter-finals

Semi-finals

Squad information

Playing statistics

|-
! colspan=14 style=background:#dcdcdc; text-align:center| Goalkeepers

|-
! colspan=14 style=background:#dcdcdc; text-align:center| Defenders

|-
! colspan=14 style=background:#dcdcdc; text-align:center| Midfielders

|-
! colspan=14 style=background:#dcdcdc; text-align:center| Forwards

|-
! colspan=14 style=background:#dcdcdc; text-align:center| Players transferred out during the season

Goalscorers
Includes all competitive matches. The list is sorted alphabetically by surname when total goals are equal.

Squad list
Players and squad numbers last updated on 8 January 2020.

Transfers

In

Out

Notes

References

Wydad AC seasons
Wydad Casablanca
Wydad Casablanca